Jan Everse (born 5 January 1954 in Rotterdam) is a retired Dutch football player and manager, who is currently head coach at amateur side BVCB.

Playing career

Club
He made his professional debut for Feyenoord in a November 1973 Eredivisie match against Roda JC and also played for their arch rivals Ajax in the 1970s. In 1980 Everse was forced to retire from professional football due to a heavy injury, his final game was in December 1979 against Excelsior.

International
Everse made his debut for the Netherlands in an April 1975 friendly match against Belgium and he won his second and final cap in May that year against Yugoslavia.

Managerial career
After his player career, he coached several amateur sides before taking charge of FC Zwolle in 1996. He then managed Sparta and Finnish outfit FC Jokerit, where he left after a row with the club's chairman. He then had spells at amateur sides Zwart-Wit '28 and Excelsior Maassluis before joining Zwolle for a second spell in 2006. He was given the sack in March 2009 after a highly publicized incident involving the son of a member of the club's board.

On 6 February 2010 SC Heerenveen officials hired Everse as their coach until June 2010, replacing Jan de Jonge. He coached Sparta for a second time during the 2010–2011 season, but left the club in February 2011 due to poor results. In 2015, he managed Dutch Eredivisie side FC Dordrecht, only to quit in March 2016 over a feud with technical director Marco Boogers. He was appointed head coach at BVCB Bergschenhoek in summer 2017.

Personal life
Everse lives in Bergschenhoek. His father Jan Everse sr. played 3 games for Netherlands. They were the first father and son to play for the Oranje.

References

External links
 
 Profile 

1954 births
Living people
Footballers from Rotterdam
Association football fullbacks
Dutch footballers
Netherlands international footballers
Feyenoord players
AFC Ajax players
Eredivisie players
Dutch football managers
Kozakken Boys managers
PEC Zwolle managers
Sparta Rotterdam managers
Zwart-Wit '28 managers
SC Heerenveen managers
FC Dordrecht managers
Dutch expatriate football managers
Expatriate football managers in Finland
Dutch expatriates in Finland
Dutch association football commentators
Excelsior Maassluis managers
RVVH managers